David Fyodorovich Oistrakh (– 24 October 1974), was a Soviet classical violinist, violist and conductor.

Oistrakh collaborated with major orchestras and musicians from many parts of the world and was the dedicatee of numerous violin works, including both of Dmitri Shostakovich's violin concerti and the violin concerto by Aram Khachaturian. He is considered one of the preeminent violinists of the 20th century.

Life and career

Early years
Oistrakh was born to a Jewish family in Odessa, Kherson Governorate, Russian Empire (today part of Ukraine). His father was Fischl Eustrach, son of a second guild merchant, and his mother was Beyle Oistrakh. At the age of five, young Oistrakh 7began his studies of the violin and viola as a pupil of Pyotr Stolyarsky. In his studies with Stolyarsky he became very good friends with Iosif Brodsky, Nathan Milstein and other violinists with whom he collaborated numerous times after achieving fame since their beginnings as fellow students at the Stolyarsky School.

In 1914, at the age of six, Oistrakh performed his debut concert. He entered the Odessa Conservatory in 1923, where he studied until his graduation in 1926. At the conservatory he also studied harmony with the composer Mykola Vilinsky. His 1926 graduation concert consisted of Bach's Chaconne, Tartini's Devil's Trill Sonata, Rubinstein's Viola Sonata, and Prokofiev's Violin Concerto No. 1 in D major. In 1927, Oistrakh appeared in Kiev as soloist in Glazunov Violin Concerto in a performance conducted by the composer, which earned the violinist an invitation to play the Tchaikovsky Violin Concerto in Leningrad with the Philharmonic Orchestra under Nikolai Malko the following year.

In Moscow
In 1927, Oistrakh relocated to Moscow, where he gave his first recital and met his future wife: the pianist Tamara Rotareva (1906–1976). They were married a year later and had one child, Igor Oistrakh, who was born in 1931. Igor Oistrakh later followed his father's path as a violinist, and eventually performed and recorded side by side with his father, including Bach's Double Concerto, which they first recorded in 1951, and Mozart's Sinfonia Concertante. In at least one of the recordings of Mozart's Sinfonia Concertante, Igor Oistrakh played violin, while Oistrakh played viola.

From 1934 onwards, Oistrakh held a position teaching at the Moscow Conservatory, and was later made professor in 1939. Some of his colleagues while teaching at the conservatory included Yuri Yankelevich and Boris Goldstein. Oistrakh taught Oleg Kagan, Valery Klimov (who later succeeded Oistrakh's position at the Moscow Conservatory), Emmy Verhey, Oleh Krysa, Gidon Kremer, Yulia Brodskaya (Julia Verba), Zoya Petrosyan, Jean Ter-Merguerian, Victor Danchenko, Victor Pikaizen, Cyrus Forough, Olga Parhomenko, and his son Igor Oistrakh.  In the 1950s, David Oistrakh invited Yulia Brodskaya to be his assistant in teaching solo and chamber music and Rosa Fine as his assistant for solo students.

From 1940 to 1963, Oistrakh performed extensively in a trio that also included the cellist Sviatoslav Knushevitsky and the pianist Lev Oborin. It was sometimes called the "Oistrakh Trio". Oistrakh collaborated extensively with Oborin, as well as Jacques Thibaud, a French violinist.

During World War II
During World War II he was active in the Soviet Union, premiering new concerti by Nikolai Miaskovsky and Aram Khachaturian as well as two sonatas by his friend Sergei Prokofiev.  He was also awarded the Stalin Prize in 1942. The final years of the war saw the blossoming of a friendship with Shostakovich, which led to the two violin concertos and the sonata, all of which were to be premiered by and become firmly associated with Oistrakh in the following years. Oistrakh's career was set from this point, although the Soviet Union was "protective" of its people and refused to let him perform abroad. He continued to teach in the Moscow Conservatory, but when Nazi Germany invaded the Soviet Union, he went to the front lines, playing for soldiers and factory workers under intensely difficult conditions. Arguably one of the most heroic acts in his life was a performance of Tchaikovsky's Violin Concerto to the end in the central music hall during the Battle of Stalingrad in the winter of 1942 while central Stalingrad was being massively bombed by the German forces.  At least one source indicates that Oistrakh performed there that winter.

International travel
Oistrakh was allowed to travel after the end of the war.  He travelled to the countries in the Soviet bloc and even to the West. His first foreign engagement was to appear at the newly founded "Prague Spring" Festival where he was met with enormous success. In 1949 he gave his first concert in the West – in Helsinki. In 1951, he appeared at the "Maggio Musicale" Festival in Florence, in 1952 he was in East Germany for the Beethoven celebrations, France in 1953, Britain in 1954, and eventually, in 1955, he was allowed to tour the United States. By 1959, he was beginning to establish a second career as a conductor, and in 1960 he was awarded the coveted Lenin Prize. His Moscow conducting debut followed in 1962, and by 1967 he had established a partnership with the celebrated Soviet pianist Sviatoslav Richter.

Later years
The year 1968 saw wide celebrations for the violinist's sixtieth birthday, which included a celebratory performance in the Great Hall of the Moscow Conservatory of the Tchaikovsky concerto, one of his favourite works, under the baton of Gennady Rozhdestvensky. Oistrakh was now seen as one of the great violinists of his time, alongside Romania's George Enescu and Lithuanian-born Jascha Heifetz.

Oistrakh suffered a heart attack as early as 1964. He survived and continued to work at a furious pace. He had already become one of the principal cultural ambassadors for the Soviet Union to the West in live concerts and recordings. After conducting a cycle of Brahms with the Concertgebouw Orchestra, he died from another heart attack in Amsterdam in 1974. His remains were returned to Moscow, where he was interred in Novodevichy Cemetery.

Distinctions
Oistrakh received many awards and distinctions. Within the Soviet Union, David Oistrakh was awarded the Stalin Prize in 1942, the title of People's Artist of the USSR in 1953, and the Lenin Prize in 1960. He also won the 1935 Soviet Union Competition. Several reputable works from the standard violin repertoire are dedicated to Oistrakh, including a concerto by Khachaturian, two concerti by Shostakovich, and several other pieces.

Oistrakh's fame and success were not limited to the Soviet Union: he was placed second at the Henryk Wieniawski Violin Competition in Warsaw, after the 16-year-old prodigy Ginette Neveu, and further improved upon that by winning the grand prize in the Queen Elisabeth Competition in Brussels.

The asteroid 42516 Oistrach is named in honour of him and his son, the violinist Igor Oistrakh.

Instruments
Oistrakh is known to have played at least seven Stradivarius violins owned by the Soviet Union. He initially selected the 1702 Conte di Fontana Stradivarius, which he played for 10 years before exchanging it for the 1705 Marsick Stradivarius in June 1966, which he played until his death.

Oistrakh used  bows by Albert Nürnberger and André Richaume throughout his life.
Up until 1957, he used a Nürnberger bow.
"The André Richaume bow bought by his son Igor Oistrakh in 1957 had filled David with such enthusiasm that Igor made a gift of it."
Oistrakh had remarked that this (Richaume) bow gave him great satisfaction, so much so that when in Paris he had to meet Richaume in person.

Chess
Oistrakh was an avid chess player in the 1930s, when Stalin's government was actively encouraging its best minds to pursue chess as a hobby. His 1937 match against the composer Sergei Prokofiev was a widely observed event in the Soviet Union and is seen as an important factor in the game's enduring popularity in ex-Soviet nations today. Oistrakh handily defeated Prokofiev in the ten-game match; Prokofiev resigned after seven games. Only one game transcript survives, and it records a draw between the two players.

Honours and awards

Soviet
 Two Orders of Lenin – 1946 and 1966
 Order of the Badge of Honour, twice – 1937 and ?
 People's Artist of the USSR, 1953
 Stalin Prize, 1st class – 1943
 Lenin Prize – 1960
 Honoured Artist of the RSFSR

Foreign
 Grand Cross of the Order of the Lion of Finland (1966)
 Grand Officer of the Order of Leopold II (Belgium, 1967)

Recordings
Oistrakh made recordings for the state classical music label, Melodiya. These recordings were marketing in the west under EMI Records and in the U.S.A. under Angel Records.  He made a few guest recordings with the Philadelphia Orchestra under the direction of Eugene Ormandy. These were issued by Columbia Records. In the 21st century, many of the Melodiya recordings have been reissued by Warner Classics, whose parent company acquired EMI's classical catalog.

Legacy
There is a yearly music festival, "The David Oistrakh Festival", from late August to October in Estonia.
Moscow International David Oistrakh Violin Competition is a biennial competition for young violinists held since 2006 in memory of David Oistrakh, organized by the non-profit David Oistrakh Charity Foundation. The competition, supported by Moscow government's Department of Culture, the Ministry for Culture of Russia and the Moscow Conservatory, is a member of the European Union of Music Competitions for Youth.

The competition aims to popularize and develop the best traditions of Russian violin performance, and to discover young musicians.

See also
 Moscow International David Oistrakh Violin Competition

Notes

References

Further reading

External links

 A Portrait (in Russian)
 Allmusic Discography
 

1908 births
1974 deaths
Ukrainian classical violinists
Russian classical violinists
Male classical violinists
Soviet classical violinists
20th-century classical violinists
Jewish classical violinists
Stalin Prize winners
Lenin Prize winners
Recipients of the Order of Lenin
People's Artists of the USSR
Honored Artists of the RSFSR
Commanders Grand Cross of the Order of the Lion of Finland
Grand Officers of the Order of Leopold II
Prize-winners of the Queen Elisabeth Competition
Henryk Wieniawski Violin Competition prize-winners
Grammy Award winners
Moscow Conservatory alumni
Russian Jews
Ukrainian Jews
Soviet Jews
Burials at Novodevichy Cemetery
Odesa Jews
Jewish Ukrainian musicians
20th-century Russian male musicians
Musicians from Odesa